Baldwin High School may refer to:

Baldwin Middle-Senior High School, Baldwin, Florida
Baldwin High School (Georgia), Milledgeville, Georgia
Henry Perrine Baldwin High School, Wailuku, Hawaii
Baldwin High School (Kansas), Baldwin City, Kansas
Baldwin Senior High School (Michigan), Baldwin, Michigan
Baldwin Senior High School (New York), Baldwin, New York
Baldwin High School (Pennsylvania), Baldwin, Pennsylvania
The Baldwin School, a private all-girls school in Pennsylvania